The Lady of the Camellias is a 1981 French-Italian drama film directed by Mauro Bolognini and starring Isabelle Huppert. It tells the actual story of Alphonsine Plessis, who became a famous courtesan in Paris and the inspiration for the novel La Dame aux camélias by Alexandre Dumas, fils, which has in turn become the source for many plays, operas, ballets, and films.

Plot
Alphonsine, growing up motherless in absolute poverty, goes alone to Paris and finds work as a seamstress. In the evening most of the girls she works with work as prostitutes but one is a cloakroom attendant at the opera house and takes her there to help. Seeing high society on display fills her with the desire to join their world.

Illiterate, her only asset being her body, she soon becomes the mistress of a young nobleman. From him she passes to a wealthy old aristocrat and then elopes to England with the Count de Perregaux, who marries her there. Though he makes her a Countess and gives her a taste for opium, he finds matrimony is not for him and leaves her free to live her own life. Never short of admirers, she becomes one of the most famous courtesans in Paris, attracting even Franz Liszt.

Among many struck by her fame and charm is a young writer Alexandre Dumas, fils, son of the illustrious writer  Alexandre Dumas, père. For a while he persuades her to stay with him in the country, in the hope it will assuage her tuberculosis and curb her wild spending. But she wants to go out as she has lived and, returning to her Parisian world, dies in 1847 at age 23, leaving behind massive debt. Alexandre turns her story into a novel, which is a great success.

Cast
 Isabelle Huppert as Alphonsine Plessis
 Gian Maria Volonté as Plessis
 Bruno Ganz as Count Perregaux
 Fabrizio Bentivoglio as Dumas son
 Clio Goldsmith as Clemence
 Mario Maranzana as Dumas father
 Yann Babilée as Agenor
 Carla Fracci as Marguerite Gauthier
 Cécile Vassort as Henriette
 David Jalil as Maxence
 Piero Vida
 Fabio Traversa as Priest
 Remo Remotti
 Mattia Sbragia
 Clara Colosimo
 Gina Rovere
 Stefania Pierangelini as Thérèse
 Fernando Rey as Count Stackelberg

See also
 Isabelle Huppert on screen and stage

References

External links

1981 films
1980s historical drama films
1980s French-language films
French historical drama films
Italian historical drama films
Films directed by Mauro Bolognini
Films based on Camille
Films scored by Ennio Morricone
Films produced by Margaret Ménégoz
Films with screenplays by Jean Aurenche
1981 drama films
1980s French films
1980s Italian films